Rotalia Island is the rocky island off the north coast of Nelson Island in the South Shetland Islands, Antarctica extending 310 m in southeast-northwest direction and 250 m in southwest-northeast direction.

The island is “named after the ocean fishing trawler Rotalia of the Bulgarian company Ocean Fisheries – Burgas whose ships operated in the waters of South Georgia, Kerguelen, the South Orkney Islands, South Shetland Islands and Antarctic Peninsula from 1970 to the early 1990s.  The Bulgarian fishermen, along with those of the Soviet Union, Poland and East Germany are the pioneers of modern Antarctic fishing industry.”

Location
British mapping in 1968.

Maps
 South Shetland Islands. Scale 1:200000 topographic map No. 3373. DOS 610 - W 62 58. Tolworth, UK, 1968.
 Antarctic Digital Database (ADD). Scale 1:250000 topographic map of Antarctica. Scientific Committee on Antarctic Research (SCAR). Since 1993, regularly upgraded and updated.

Notes

References
 Rotalia Island. SCAR Composite Gazetteer of Antarctica.
 Bulgarian Antarctic Gazetteer. Antarctic Place-names Commission. (details in Bulgarian, basic data in English)

External links
 Rotalia Island. Copernix satellite image

Islands of the South Shetland Islands
Ocean Fisheries – Burgas Co
Bulgaria and the Antarctic